Samuel Murray Rosenstein (June 7, 1909 – December 11, 1995) was a judge of the United States Customs Court.

Education and career

Born on June 7, 1909, in Frankfort, Kentucky, Rosenstein received an Artium Baccalaureus degree in 1928 from the University of Kentucky and a Bachelor of Laws in 1931 from the University of Cincinnati College of Law. He entered private practice in Frankfort from 1931 to 1946. He was the City Prosecutor of Frankfort from 1933 to 1941. He was Special Counsel for the Commonwealth of Kentucky from 1935 to 1943. He was the Acting County Attorney of Franklin County, Kentucky from 1941 to 1942. He returned to private practice in Louisville, Kentucky from 1946 to 1968.

Federal judicial service

Rosenstein was nominated by President Lyndon B. Johnson on July 17, 1968, to a seat on the United States Customs Court vacated by Judge Webster Oliver. He was confirmed by the United States Senate on July 25, 1968, and received his commission on July 25, 1968. He assumed senior status due to a certified disability on December 31, 1970. He was reassigned by operation of law to the United States Court of International Trade on November 1, 1980, by 94 Stat. 1727. His service terminated on December 11, 1995, due to his death in Lexington, Kentucky.

References

Sources
 

1909 births
1995 deaths
Judges of the United States Customs Court
People from Frankfort, Kentucky
Lawyers from Louisville, Kentucky
University of Kentucky alumni
University of Cincinnati College of Law alumni
Judges of the United States Court of International Trade
United States federal judges appointed by Lyndon B. Johnson
20th-century American judges